2009 Trofeo Cassa di Risparmio may refer to two ATP tennis tournaments, both sponsored by Italian saving banks from Alessandria and Ascoli Piceno respectively:
 2009 Alessandria Challenger (2009 Trofeo Cassa di Risparmio di Alessandria)
 2009 San Benedetto Tennis Cup (2009 Carisap Tennis Cup)

See also
 Cassa di Risparmio (disambiguation)